WLXR may refer to:

 WLXR (AM), a radio station (1490 AM) licensed to serve La Crosse, Wisconsin, United States
 WGSL, a radio station (104.9 FM) licensed to serve La Crosse, Wisconsin, which held the call sign WLXR-FM from 1973 to 2020